Ocean Bank is the largest independent state-chartered commercial bank headquartered in Florida. Founded in 1982, Ocean Bank is active in commercial real estate, funding projects by real estate developers, construction companies, and land owners.

The bank also funds domestic commercial and industrial loans and offers retail banking services.  Its wealth management division provides domestic and international private banking services.

The bank offers its customers financial products that include 24-hour banking services, mobile banking, commercial and personal loans, factoring, cash management, and merchant card services. With $5.4 billion in assets and 652 employees, it is one of the four largest community banks in South Florida, where Ocean Bank operates 20 branches.

Community
The bank supports several community programs and education, including the United Way, the Orange Bowl Committee, Camillus House, Florida International University, Florida Memorial University, Belen Jesuit Preparatory School, The Carrollton School, and The Dade Public Education Fund.

Executive Officers
A. Alfonso Macedo, President, CEO and Chairman
Yuni Navarro, Executive Vice President / Chief Administrative Officer
Manuel M. Del Cañal, Executive Vice President / Wealth Management
Eddie Diaz, Executive Vice President / Head of Corporate Lending
Pedro Max, Executive Vice President / Head of Business Banking and Branches
Sam Monti, Executive Vice President / Chief Credit Officer
Stan Rubin, Executive Vice President / Chief Financial Officer & Chief Risk Officer
Rogelio Villarreal, Executive Vice President / Head of Commercial Lending
Barbara Brick, Senior Vice President / Director of BSA & Compliance
Rodolfo Bucaro, Senior Vice President & Chief Information Officer

Branches
Miami-Dade County

Main Office, Airport West, Aventura, Bird Road, Brickell, Coral Gables, Coral Way, Doral, Downtown Miami, Kendall, Miami Beach, Miami Lakes, Miller Drive, Palm Springs, Pinecrest, South Miami, West Flagler, West Hialeah, West Kendall, West Miami

Broward County

Downtown Fort Lauderdale and Weston, Fla.

Wealth Management
Main Office, Brickell

References

Banks based in Florida
Companies based in Miami
1982 establishments in Florida
American companies established in 1982
Banks established in 1982